100% Hits: The Best of 2000 is a 2000 compilation album released by EMI Music Australia and Warner Music Australia.  The album was the #9 compilation album on the 2001 year-end charts in Australia. The album was certified platinum in Australia.

Track listing

Disc 1
Savage Garden – "Crash and Burn" (4:42)
The Corrs – "Breathless" (3:28)
Bardot – "These Days" (3:15)
Melanie C – "I Turn to You" (4:13)
Robbie Williams – "Rock DJ" (4:18)
Morcheeba – "Rome Wasn't Built in a Day" (3:35)
Vitamin C – "Graduation (Friends Forever)" (4:25)
Taxiride – "Everywhere You Go" (3:37)
The Whitlams – "Blow Up the Pokies" (3:25)
Filter – "Take a Picture" (4:24)
Area-7 – "Start Making Sense" (3:32)
Billie Piper – "Something Deep Inside" (3:23)
Aleesha Rome – "Search My Heaven" (3:54)
Alice Deejay – "Better Off Alone" (3:37)
Fragma – "Toca's Miracle" (3:24)
Tina Cousins – "Pray" (3:56)
Steps – "Say You'll Be Mine" (3:34)
Madasun – "Don't You Worry" (4:03)
Backstreet Boys – "Show Me the Meaning of Being Lonely" (3:56)
Spiller – "Groovejet (If This Ain't Love)" (3:52)

Disc 2
Killing Heidi – "Mascara" (4:51)
Madison Avenue – "Don't Call Me Baby" (3:48)
Groove Armada – "I See You Baby" (4:42)
Kelis – "Caught Out There" (4:11)
Kaylan – "Shake It" (3:52)
NSYNC – "Bye Bye Bye" (3:21)
Melanie B – "Tell Me" (3:54)
Britney Spears – "Oops!... I Did It Again" (3:53)
M2M – "Don't Say You Love Me" (3:45)
ATB – "Don't Stop!" (2:45)
William Orbit – "Adagio for Strings" (3:42)
Groove Terminator – "One More Time (The Sunshine Song)" (3:24)
Vengaboys – "Shalala Lala" (3:36)
Cher – "Dov'è l'amore" (3:46)
Third Eye Blind – "Never Let You Go" (3:58)
Coldplay – "Yellow" (4:31)
Richard Ashcroft – "C'mon People (We're Making It Now)" (5:03)
Faith Hill – "Breathe" (4:09)
Joe – "I Wanna Know" (5:16)

References

External links
 100% Hits: The Best Of 2000

2000 compilation albums
EMI Records compilation albums
2000 in Australian music